The 2001 Little League Softball World Series was held in Kirkland, Washington from August 10 to August 15, 2001. Four teams from the United States and four from throughout the world competed for the Little League Softball World Champions.

Teams

Results

Elimination round

 

Little League Softball World Series
2001 in softball
2001 in sports in Oregon
Softball in Oregon